The Sirente crater is a small shallow seasonal lake in Abruzzo, central Italy. Its formation has prompted a number of theories in recent years. Although in the absence of shock-metamorphic and / or geochemical evidence it is not yet possible to confirm the meteoritic impact theory, no other theories for the origin of this geological structure have been proven yet.

Interest in the Sirente crater began in the late 1990s after Swedish geologist Jens Ormö, an impact crater specialist, noticed ridges near the site that indicated a bolide collision. A research team named "The Sirente Crater Group" along with two scientists from the International Research School of Planetary Science of Pescara (IRSPS) began a detailed examination of the area. The team concluded the meteorite struck the Earth with the force of a small nuclear bomb; approximately one kiloton in yield. The blast would have created a mushroom cloud and shockwaves similar to a nuclear explosion.

Formation theories

Meteorite

The Sirente Crater Group proposed a meteoric origin for this structure in the late 1990s and results were updated in the following decade.
A calibrated age of 412 AD was given in 2002.

Anthropogenic (humans)
In 2004 a group of geologists led by Fabio Speranza working in the Istituto Nazionale di Geofisica e Vulcanologia hypothesized that the lake basin was excavated by humans in order to collect natural water for livestock. A similar "shepherdogenic" hypothesis was that the site was a sheep dip, considering the lack of any evidence for impact shock in the area.
The nature of the depressions are now believed by Speranza et al. to be karstic or be the result of human activity combined with the action of natural karstic processes. Although the crater lake was suggested to be just part of a larger crater field: comprising about 30 individual depressions in the Sirente area, studies have shown the "crater field" is more likely to be the result of human activity.

The theory of the combined anthropic excavation and karstic origin for the Sirente crater doesn't seem however compatible with the result of some seismic and electrical resistivity tests that were  performed under the surface of the Sirente lake. More specifically, the geological structure appears too deep to have been excavated by humans in a highly unstable material context and a downward continuation typical of the underground removal of material during karst development is also lacking.

Large numbers of metallic fragments have been found in samples taken from within the crater area. Analysis has proved they were pieces from exploded ordnance such as bombs and grenades. This had led to the theory that wartime bombing could also be the cause of the crater.

Geological 
In 2005 Dr Francesco Stoppa from  the Gabriele d'Annunzio University proposed that a rapid emission of mud and/or water could also be a potential cause for the basin's formation.

Analysis and interpretation 

An impact generating a crater the size of one at Sirente would have been visible from a great distance. Skyward it would have first been seen as a strip of fire that turned into a fireball before culminating in a pyrotechnic bolide.

Early radiocarbon dating apparently fixed the formation of the main crater within the 4th and 5th centuries AD (c. 301–401 AD). In this period, the territory was part of the Roman municipium of Superaequum. A local Roman village belonging to Superaequum is known to have been suddenly abandoned possibly in consequence to fire during the 4th century. Christian catacombs dating to the same period reveal bodies were piled-up hurriedly in a manner indicating a public calamity.

A story, taken from the oral traditions of Abruzzo, concerning the region's religious conversion from Paganism to Christianity possibly records the impact event in the 5th century AD.

It was in the afternoon...an uproar hit the mountain and quartered the giant oaks announcing the violent arrival of the Goddess. A sudden and intense heat overwhelmed the people and a shout echoed all around, splitting the air with its trail of violence [...] All of a sudden, over there, in the distance, in the sky, a new star, never seen before, bigger than the other ones, came nearer and nearer, appeared and disappeared behind the top of the eastern mountains. Peoples’ eyes looked at the strange light growing bigger and bigger. Soon the star shone as large as a new sun. An irresistible, dazzling light pervaded the sky. The oak leaves shuddered, discoloured, and curled up. The forest lost its sap.

The Sirente was shaking. In a tremendous rumble the statue sank into a sudden chasm.  The satyrs and the Bacchantes fell down senseless. A huge silence fell.  It seemed as if time had stopped in the ancient wood near the temple at the foot of the Sirente, and it looked like the mountain had never existed.  The entire valley became dumb. Not a breath of wind could be heard, nor a sheep bleating from the numerous herds, nor a rustle from the strong trees, nor a human sound. After an endless period of time, when stars shone in the sky without the moon, a new breeze came to stir the leaves; sheep were heard again and the Mountain was dressed in the light of a new dawn.

Faint stars disappeared, blue sky slowly came back and the Sirente became a golden mountain in the first rays of the new sun. It looked like the Valley was full of roses. Newly awake, men listened closely to the death rattle of the Goddess at the foot of the wood; and then they saw the statue of the Madonna with the Holy Child in her arms who was sitting on a throne of light and was surrounded by light.

The location and contemporaneous formation of the Sirente impact has led some researchers to re-examine the historic occasion (the Battle of the Milvian Bridge on 28 October 312) when Constantine I was said to have had a vision prompting his conversion to Christianity.

In a 2003 paper, Santilli, Ormö, et al. noted that, shortly before the battle of the Milvian Bridge, Constantine I and his military forces were camped only  WSW from the proposed impact site. Though a coincidence between the two events is speculation, the hypothesis that the Sirente impact might have been mistaken for a divine act was widely reported in the media.

However, the vision at the Battle of the Milvian Bridge has been also been considered as a phenomenon called a sun dog.

References

Footnotes

Works cited

 New Scientist  (UK) – 21/6/2003 – D. L. Chandler, 'Crater find backs falling star legend
 BBC News World (UK) – 23/6/2003 – David Whitehouse, 'Space impact saved Christianity'
 Daily Post – Brighton (UK) – 19/6/2003 – Did crater change history?
 The Birmingham Post – (UK) – 19/6/2003 – Exploding asteroid 'converted emperor
 Discovery Channel (UK) – 24/6/2003 – R. Lorenzi, 'Christianity: came from Outer Space'
 Novice (Slovenia) – 26/6/2003 – 'Ali je krscantvo prislo iz vesolja?'
 Vietnam (Vietnam) – 27/6/2003 – Minh Son, 'Tiểu hành tinh cải giáo cho Hoàng đế Constantine?'
 Die Welt (Germany) – 29/6/2003 – R.H. Latusseck. 'Ein Himmelskorper verandert di Welt'
 Gazeta (Poland) – 29/6/2003 – Piotr Cienslinski, 'Meteoyt ktory zmienit dzieje chrzescijanstawa'
 The Salt Lake Tribune (USA) – 5/7/2003 – 'Touched by a ... meteorite?'
 Korearth (Korea) – 5/7/2003
 Herald Sun (Australia) – 20/7/2003 – Bryan Patterson, 'What's in our hearts counts, not tests results'
 Pravda (Slovakia) – 29/7/2003 – 'Krest'ania mail st'astlie, zachrànil ich pad meteroritu'
 Deutschlandfunk (Germany) – 30/7/2003 – 'Ein Geologe entzaubert das himmlische Zeichen Kaiser Konstantins'
 Newton (Italy) – Aug. 2003 – Roberto Santilli, 'Il meteorite dei miracoli'
 Il Tempo (Italy) – 31/7/2003 – Natalia Poggi, 'Il lago del meteorite: un segno divino'
 Military History (USA) – n.2/2003 – 'Costantine and Christianity'
 History Today (UK) – 1/9/2003 – 'The discovery of an asteroid crater in the Italian Apennine mountains has prompted speculation that it may have been the cause of the legendary conversion of the Roman Emperor Constantine'
 Il Corriere della Sera (Italy) – 19/04/2004 – F. Foresta Martin, 'Il cratere in Abruzzo è nato come abbeveratorio'
 Air & Space (USA) – Apr./May 2004 – Tony Reichhardt, 'Crater Face'
 Nuovo Orione (Italy) – Aug. 2004 – Maurizio Vicoli, 'Secinaro: un meteorite fra storia e leggenda'
 National Geographic Channel – July 2011 – Fireball of Christ

External links
 Crater find backs falling star legend
 Space impact 'saved Christianity'
 It Came from Outer Space?
 The day the sky fell in
 Hyperbole in Reports on NEOs and Impacts – Oct. 2004
 The Sirente craters (Italy): On the possible origin of geomagnetic anomalies (Ormö et al. 2007)
 Crater impostor unmasked as sheep-dip
 Unravelling the Geometry of a Holocene Continental Basin by Geoelectric Profiles and High-Resolution Magnetic Survey: Evidence from the “Sirente Crater Field” (Italy)

Geology controversies
Landforms of Abruzzo
Lakes of Italy
Controversies in Italy